Snakeskin Glacier is a tributary glacier, 15 nautical miles (28 km) long, flowing northwest to enter Keltie Glacier at the east side of Supporters Range. Named by New Zealand Geological Survey Antarctic Expedition (NZGSAE) (1961–62) as being descriptive of the ice and snow patterns observed on the glacier's surface.

Glaciers of Dufek Coast